The Fifteenth East Asia Summit was held in Hanoi, Vietnam on November 14, 2020. The East Asia Summit is an annual meeting of national leaders from the East Asian region and adjoining countries. EAS has evolved as forum for strategic dialogue and cooperation on political, security and economic issues of common regional concern and plays an important role in the regional architecture.

Attending delegations
The heads of state and heads of government of the eighteen countries participated in the summit. The host of the 2020 East Asian Summit is also the Chairperson of ASEAN, the Prime Minister of Vietnam, Nguyễn Xuân Phúc. The summit was held through video conference.

Gallery

References

2020 conferences
2020 in international relations
21st-century diplomatic conferences (Asia-Pacific)
ASEAN meetings
2020 in Vietnam
November 2020 events in Vietnam